Harshavardhan Neotia (born 19 July 1961) is the chairman of the Ambuja Neotia Group, a conglomerate headquartered in Kolkata.

Life and career

Harshavardhan Neotia was born and brought up in Kolkata in a Marwari family. He attended La Martiniere Calcutta for Boys and graduated in Commerce from St. Xavier's College, Kolkata. He has completed HBS's Executive Education Programme - Owner President Management Program (OPM) from Harvard Business School.

He is the founder of one of the first joint sector companies in India, “Bengal Ambuja Housing Development Limited” in partnership with the Government of West Bengal. The idea behind this joint sector venture was to promote social housing development in urban India. Under his guidance, Ambuja Neotia Group has developed many properties across India. Harshavardhana Neotia's maiden project, “Udayan” was declared a ‘Model Housing Project’ by the union government. He is also a pioneer of modern Public–private partnership (PPP) housing system in Kolkata.

He is a member of the board of governors' of IIM Calcutta. His company Ambuja Neotia Group has developed many modern real estate projects in West Bengal including Udayan~The Condoville, Ujjwala~The Condoville, Upohar~The Condoville, Ecospace Business Park, Ecostation, Taj City Centre Kolkata, Taj Chia Kutir, Raajkutir IHCL SeleQtions, Utalika Luxury, City Centre Malls in Salt Lake, New Town, Siliguri, Haldia, Raipur and Patna, Raichak on Ganges and AltAir Boutique Hotel.

Awards
He was conferred the Padmashri in the year 1999 for his initiative in the field of social housing.
He has been awarded with Young Presidents' Organization YPO Legacy of Honor Award and works as the Honorary Consul of Israel in West Bengal.

References 

University of Calcutta alumni
1961 births
Businesspeople from Kolkata
Marwari people
Living people
Recipients of the Padma Shri in trade and industry
ATK (football club) owners